Krainer is a surname. Notable people with the surname include:

Adrian Krainer (snowboarder) (born 1992), Austrian snowboarder
Adrian R. Krainer, Uruguayan-American biochemist and molecular geneticist
Lore Krainer (1930–2020), Austrian actress, restaurateur, and cabaret singer-songwriter
Marco Krainer (born 1981), Austrian chef

See also
Rainer (surname)